Glenea albofasciata is a species of beetle in the family Cerambycidae. It was described by Charles Joseph Gahan in 1897.

References

albofasciata
Beetles described in 1897